The Class Struggle (Erfurt Program) is an 1892 book-length work by Karl Kautsky. It was first published in Stuttgart and was the official commentary of the Social Democratic Party of Germany (SPD) on their brief 1891 Erfurt Program (by Kautsky, party leader August Bebel and Eduard Bernstein). It became and is still considered the seminal (and popular) text for Orthodox Marxism and the Second International.

History
Eduard Bernstein is acknowledged in the first edition preface as having given advice and critical review.
Historian Donald Sassoon wrote it “became one of the most widely read texts of socialist activists throughout Europe” and Kautsky's commentary “was translated into sixteen languages before 1914 and became the accepted popular summa of Marxism” around the world.
It was first translated into English by Daniel De Leon in 1894 and an adaption published in The People (Socialist Labor Party newspaper) in New York.

In 1894, Lenin translated it into Russian. This was during his exile in Geneva.

20th century

The eighth German edition from 1907 was translated by William Bohn and published in 1910 by Charles H. Kerr Publishing Company in Chicago. In 1911, Chapters 2, 3, 4 and 5 (from the 1899 translations by Daniel De Leon) were published in four SLP pamphlets, The Working Class, The Capitalist Class, The Class Struggle and The Socialist Republic (the latter from Chapter 4 The Commonwealth of the Future).
Dietz Verlag (Berlin) reprinted it in German in 1965.
In 1971 another English version was published by W. W. Norton & Company.

21st century
Author Lars T. Lih coined the term Erfurtianism to describe the political views put forward in Kautsky's book.

Chapters

1892 German original
 Der Untergang des Kleinbetriebes
 Das Proletariat
 Die Kapitalistenklasse
 Der Zukunftsstaat
 Der Klassenkampf

1894 English translation
Published separately as pamphlets of the Labor library.
 The Proletariat
 The capitalist class
 The co-operative commonwealth
 The class struggle

1899 English translation
Published separately as pamphlets of the People library.
 The working class
 The capitalist class
 The socialist republic
 The class struggle

1910 English translation
The Passing of Small Production
The Proletariat
The Capitalist Class
The Commonwealth of the Future
The Class Struggle

References

External links
The Class Struggle by Karl Kautsky Charles H. Kerr 1910 English translation  in Marxists Internet Archive
1892 German original

1892 in politics
Social Democratic Party of Germany
1892 books
Karl Kautsky